Richard de Luci (or Lucy; 1089 – 14 July 1179) was first noted as High Sheriff of Essex, after which he was made Chief Justiciar of England.

Biography 
His mother was Aveline, the niece and heiress of William Goth. In the charter for Sées Cathedral in February 1130–31 Henry I refers to Richard de Luci and his mother, Aveline. His brother, Walter de Luci, was abbot of Battle Abbey.

An early reference to the de Luci family refers to the render by Henry I of the Lordship of Diss, Norfolk to Richard de Luci, Governor of Falaise, Normandy, after defending it with great valour and heroic conduct when besieged by Geoffrey, Earl of Anjou.

In 1153–4 de Luci was granted Chipping Ongar, Essex by William, son of King Stephen and his wife, Maud of Boulogne. He may have built the motte and bailey Ongar Castle, although it is also attributed to Eustace II Count of Boulogne (c1015 – c1087). Richard de Luci was appointed Sheriff of both Essex and Hertfordshire for 1156.

When Henry II came to the throne in 1154, de Luci was made Chief Justiciar of England jointly with Robert de Beaumont, Earl of Leicester. When de Beaumont died in 1168, de Luci continued to hold the office in his own right. One of the members of his household was Roger fitzReinfrid, the brother of Walter de Coutances. Roger became a royal judge and later donated land to Lesnes Abbey in Kent, which had been founded by de Luci.

He resigned his office between September 1178 and Easter of 1179, and retired to Lesnes Abbey, where, three months later on 14 July 1179, he died and was buried.

De Luci's wife, Rohese, who is named in several documents, was possibly a sister of Faramus de Boulogne. Rohese and Faramus were children of William de Boulogne who was the son of Geoffrey fitz Eustace (son of Eustace II, Count of Boulogne) and Beatrice, daughter of Norman magnate Geoffrey de Mandeville.

Notes

References

 Oxford Dictionary of National Biography
 Powicke, F. Maurice and E. B. Fryde Handbook of British Chronology 2nd. ed. London:Royal Historical Society 1961

External links
 The Lucy & Lucey Family net
 
 Knowles, Dom David The Monastic Order in England: From the Times of St. Dunstan to the Fourth Lateran Council Second Edition Cambridge: Cambridge University Press 1976 reprint 

1089 births
1179 deaths
People from Epping Forest District
Anglo-Normans
Justiciars of England
High Sheriffs of Essex
High Sheriffs of Hertfordshire
People from Chipping Ongar